Mayfair or Parkside-Mayfair is a residential neighborhood in Northeast Washington, D.C., United States., on the eastern bank of the Anacostia River. It is bounded by Jay Street NE on the north, Foote Street on the south, Kenilworth Terrace and Anacostia Avenue on the west, and Kenilworth Avenue on the east. Mayfair is encircled by Jay Street and Hayes St., which met at the back of the neighborhood.

Nearby schools include Neval Thomas Elementary, located on Anacostia Avenue, Cesar Chavez Public Charter School For Public Policy (Parkside middle and high school), located on Hayes Street NE, and just over the bridge crossing I-295, Friendship Collegiate Academy, Carter G. Woodson Campus.

Notable residents
 Marvin Gaye, singer
 Clifton Powell, actor

References

Neighborhoods in Northeast (Washington, D.C.)